The Kentucky State Fair is the official state fair of Kentucky which takes place at the Kentucky Exposition Center in Louisville. The Kentucky State Fair includes competitions in crafts such as quilt-making, homebrew beers, and home-made pastries, as well as fine arts and agricultural competitions. Exhibitor spaces are available and are popular with area and regional businesses.

The Kentucky State Fair boasts  of indoor space that often feature exhibits that include health screenings, gravity-defying acrobats, magical illusionists, balloon sculptors and home improvement demonstrations.

The Kentucky State Fair World's Championship Horse Show is one of the fair's most prestigious events, where attendees and horses travel from various continents. More than 2,000 elite saddlebreds compete in the World's Championship Horse Show for more than 1.2 million in premiums and awards.

The fair was organized in 1816, just five years after the United States' first fair in Massachusetts. Fayette County farmer Colonel Lewis Sanders (no known relation to Colonel Harlan Sanders of Kentucky Fried Chicken fame) was the organizer. The event did not become an official state fair until 1902. The fair moved from city to city until 1907, when Louisville became the fair's permanent home. Churchill Downs has hosted the fair on three occasions, particularly during World War II. The fair moved to its current site at the Kentucky Exposition Center in 1956.

There were cancellations in 1862 to 1864, 1917 to 1918, and 1942 to 1944. The COVID-19 pandemic caused officials to present the 2020 fair in modified fashion.

See also
 List of attractions and events in the Louisville metropolitan area

References

External links

 Official site

 
Events in Louisville, Kentucky
Recurring events established in 1816
State fairs
August events
1816 establishments in Kentucky
Organizations based in Louisville, Kentucky